Freakazoidz is the sixth studio album by Praga Khan. It was released in 2002.

Track listing
 "Glamour Girl" – 3:20	
 "Visions of Heaven" – 5:08	
 "Kinky World" – 3:58	
 "Picture This" – 4:57	
 "Tausend Sterne" – 4:30	
 "Because of You" – 3:38	
 "Look into the Future" – 5:31	
 "Freakazoidz" – 2:55	
 "No Earthly Connection" – 6:48	
 "Skin to Skin" – 5:17	
 "Fame" – 3:14	
 "Your Lyin' Eyes" – 6:59

Notes

2002 albums
Praga Khan albums